Walter L. Ward Jr. (born October 28, 1943) was a member of the Wisconsin State Assembly.

Early life
Ward was born on October 28, 1943, in Camp Forrest in Tullahoma, Tennessee. He graduated from the Rufus King International School - High School Campus before attending Milwaukee Area Technical College, the University of Wisconsin–Milwaukee and Marquette University.

Career
Ward served in the Wisconsin Assembly from 1973 to 1981 and was a Democrat.

He was charged with sexual assault and was defeated in the next election. He was then accused of 85 election law violations for transferring funds from his campaign fund to his personal accounts.  He was found guilty and sentenced to 30 days in jail. (1980)

References

People from Tullahoma, Tennessee
Politicians from Milwaukee
Democratic Party members of the Wisconsin State Assembly
Milwaukee Area Technical College alumni
University of Wisconsin–Milwaukee alumni
Marquette University alumni
1943 births
Living people
Wisconsin politicians convicted of crimes
Rufus King International High School alumni